The 20th Legislative Assembly of British Columbia sat from 1941 to 1945. The members were elected in the British Columbia general election held in June 1941. The Liberals and Conservatives formed a coalition government led by John Hart. The Co-operative Commonwealth Federation led by Harold Winch formed the official opposition.

Norman William Whittaker served as speaker for the assembly.

Members of the 20th General Assembly 
The following members were elected to the assembly in 1941.:

Notes:

Party standings 

Notes:

By-elections 
By-elections were held to replace members for various reasons:

Notes:

Other changes 
Rossland-Trail (res. Herbert Wilfred Herridge to contest the 1945 Federal Election)

References 

Political history of British Columbia
Terms of British Columbia Parliaments
1941 establishments in British Columbia
1945 disestablishments in British Columbia
20th century in British Columbia